The 1975 Miami Toros indoor season was the first season of the new team in the new North American Soccer League indoor tournament.  It was part of the club's ninth season in professional soccer.  This year, the team finished in second place in Region 3, losing on goal-differential.  They did not make the playoffs as only the top team in each of the four regions were selected.

Background

Review

Competitions

NASL indoor regular season

Region 3
played at the Bayfront Center in St. Petersburg, Florida
 

 

*Tampa Bay wins region on goal differential, advances to semifinals

Results summaries

Results by round

Match reports

Statistics

Transfers

See also 
1975 Miami Toros indoor

References 

1975
Fort Lauderdale Strikers
Miami Toros indoor
Miami Toros